Whoops is a 1993 Hungarian comedy film directed by Gyula Maár. It was entered into the 43rd Berlin International Film Festival.

Cast
 Dezső Garas as Ede
 Mari Törőcsik as Kati
 Kati Lázár as Elvira
 István Avar as Jenő
 Gábor Máté as Külföldi vőlegényjelölt
 Gábor Nagy as Kati apja
 Andrea Söptei as Ede és Kati lánya
 Zoltán Varga
 Olga Beregszászi as Jelena
 János Derzsi as Gabika
 Erzsi Pártos as Mama

References

External links

1993 films
1993 comedy films
1990s Hungarian-language films
Films directed by Gyula Maár
Hungarian comedy films